Leonardo Vieira (Rio de Janeiro, December 28, 1968) is a Brazilian actor. He is best known for his roles in telenovelas, especially Senhora do Destino, Prova de Amor and Caminhos do Coração.

References

External links 

Brazilian male film actors
Brazilian male telenovela actors
Brazilian gay actors
Living people
1968 births